USS Burns has been the name of more than one United States Navy ship, and may refer to:

 , a destroyer in commission from 1919 to 1930
 , a destroyer in commission from 1943 to 1946

See also
 
 

United States Navy ship names